Scott Richardson Lemmon (January 28, 1968 – May 1, 2004 (age 36)) was the author of the Proxomitron web filtering software.

Software
Prior to his work on Proxomitron, Lemmon wrote software for the Atari ST line of computers.

References

External links
 
 
 

1968 births
2004 deaths
Computer programmers